Félix Sánchez, (born August 30, 1977) is a retired Dominican-American track and field athlete. He is of Dominican descent, was born and raised in the United States, and competed for the Dominican Republic, specializing in the 400 meter hurdles. He is a two-time Olympic gold medallist, winning gold in 2004 and 2012, and was also World Champion in 2001 and 2003.  Just before turning 36, he set the Masters M35 World Record with a time of 48.10. Sanchez acquired many nicknames: "Super Felix", "the Invincible", "Superman", and "the Dictator".

The Félix Sánchez Olympic Stadium, Dominican Republic’s largest stadium, is named after him.

Sánchez retired in April 2016, citing the recent birth of his son.

Early life and college
Sánchez was born in New York City to Dominican-born parents and was raised in San Diego, California. He attended University City High School and San Diego Mesa College in the city, and then went on to study psychology at the University of Southern California in 1998. Competing for University of Southern California's USC Trojans, he was a Pac-10 champion (400 m hurdles) and All-American relay champion (1600 m) in 1999.

Professional career

Sánchez opted to represent the Dominican Republic internationally, and made his debut for that nation in the Pan American games in 1999. Between 2001 and 2004 he won 43 races in a row at 400 m hurdles, including the 2001 and 2003 World Championships. He won a share of the Golden League million dollar-jackpot in 2002 after winning all 7 races.

At the 2003 Pan American Games, Sánchez won the Dominican Republic's first gold medal at the competition and also broke the Pan American Games record in the 400 m hurdles. He was named Track and Field News Track & Field Athlete of the Year in 2003. Subsequently, he won the first ever Olympic gold medal for the Dominican Republic on August 28, 2004 during the 2004 Summer Olympics in Athens, Greece.

During his 43-race winning streak, from 2001 to 2004, Sánchez was known for wearing a wristband while competing. The red flashing wristband, a souvenir from the 2000 Olympics, served as a motivation for him after failing to advance to the final in Sydney. After winning the Olympic gold medal in Athens 2004, Sánchez gave the wristband to the IAAF for auction and the profits were donated to charity. In his first race after the Olympics – and his first race without the wristband – at the Van Damme Memorial meet in Brussels, Sánchez injured his leg and had to abandon the race halfway through.

In 2012, at the age of 34, Sánchez entered the 2012 Summer Olympics. He posted the fastest qualifying time, and won  the final with a time of 47.63 seconds, the same as his winning time in Athens in 2004 and his fastest run for eight years. Sánchez became the oldest man to win the Olympic 400m hurdles title. He was the only Olympic medalist for the Dominican Republic until 45 minutes after his second gold medal, when Luguelín Santos picked up a silver medal in the 400 metres. For his performance in London Sanchez was awarded the Laureus World Comeback of the Year.

Sánchez announced his retirement in April 2016 at the age of 38, citing the recent birth of a son. He did not compete in the 2016 Olympics in Rio de Janeiro.

Competition record

References

External links

2004 interview and profile in Open Your Eyes magazine

1977 births
Living people
American male hurdlers
American sportspeople of Dominican Republic descent
Athletes (track and field) at the 1999 Pan American Games
Athletes (track and field) at the 2000 Summer Olympics
Athletes (track and field) at the 2003 Pan American Games
Athletes (track and field) at the 2004 Summer Olympics
Athletes (track and field) at the 2007 Pan American Games
Athletes (track and field) at the 2008 Summer Olympics
Athletes (track and field) at the 2011 Pan American Games
Athletes (track and field) at the 2012 Summer Olympics
Athletes (track and field) at the 2015 Pan American Games
Dominican Republic male hurdlers
Dominican Republic male sprinters
Junior college men's track and field athletes in the United States
Laureus World Sports Awards winners
Medalists at the 2004 Summer Olympics
Medalists at the 2012 Summer Olympics
Olympic athletes of the Dominican Republic
Olympic gold medalists in athletics (track and field)
Olympic gold medalists for the Dominican Republic
Pan American Games bronze medalists for the Dominican Republic
Pan American Games gold medalists for the Dominican Republic
Pan American Games medalists in athletics (track and field)
Pan American Games silver medalists for the Dominican Republic
Track and field athletes from New York City
Track and field athletes from San Diego
University of Southern California alumni
World Athletics Championships athletes for the Dominican Republic
World Athletics Championships medalists
Goodwill Games medalists in athletics
IAAF Golden League winners
Track & Field News Athlete of the Year winners
Central American and Caribbean Games gold medalists for the Dominican Republic
Competitors at the 2002 Central American and Caribbean Games
Competitors at the 2006 Central American and Caribbean Games
Competitors at the 2010 Central American and Caribbean Games
World Athletics Championships winners
Central American and Caribbean Games medalists in athletics
Competitors at the 2001 Goodwill Games
Medalists at the 2003 Pan American Games
Medalists at the 2007 Pan American Games
Medalists at the 2011 Pan American Games
Goodwill Games gold medalists in athletics